The grey-hooded attila (Attila rufus) is a species of bird in the family Tyrannidae, the tyrant flycatchers. It is endemic to Brazil.

The grey-hooded attila occurs in a coastal strip along Brazil's southeast Atlantic coast. Its natural habitats are subtropical or tropical moist lowland forest and subtropical or tropical moist montane forest.

References

External links
Grey-hooded attila videos on the Internet Bird Collection
"Gray-hooded attila" photo gallery VIREO Photo-High Res

Attila (genus)
Birds of the Atlantic Forest
Endemic birds of Brazil
Birds described in 1819
Taxa named by Louis Jean Pierre Vieillot
Taxonomy articles created by Polbot